Edward Parker Helms (born January 24, 1974) is an American actor and comedian. From 2002 to 2006, he was a correspondent on Comedy Central's The Daily Show with Jon Stewart. He played paper salesman Andy Bernard in the NBC sitcom The Office (2006–2013), and starred as Stuart Price in The Hangover trilogy. He later starred in the comedy series Rutherford Falls (2021–2022), which he co-wrote.

Ed Helms has also starred in dramatic films and comedic films such as Cedar Rapids, Jeff Who Lives at Home (both 2011), We're the Millers (2013), Vacation (2015), Chappaquiddick (2017), A Futile and Stupid Gesture, Tag (both 2018) and Together Together (2021). He provided his voice to the animated films, Everyone's Hero (2006), Monsters vs. Aliens (2009), The Lorax (2012), Captain Underpants: The First Epic Movie, Mune: Guardian of the Moon (both 2017) and Ron's Gone Wrong (2021).

He has received six Screen Actors Guild Award nominations for Outstanding Performance by an Ensemble in a Comedy Series winning in 2008. He also received a Writers Guild of America Award for Best Writing for a Comedy or Variety Special for The Fake News with Ted Nelms (2018).

Early life
Helms was born in Atlanta, Georgia. He is of English, Irish, German, Dutch, and French descent. He had open-heart surgery at age 13 to correct a severe congenital heart defect involving supravalvular aortic and pulmonic stenosis. According to Helms, his surgery lasted nine hours, and he was kept in an intensive care unit for one week after.

He attended Interlochen Center for the Arts as a youth and graduated in 1992 from The Westminster Schools, one year after The Office castmate Brian Baumgartner. Helms entered Oberlin College as a geology major, but graduated in 1996 with a Bachelor of Arts in film theory and technology. He spent a semester as an exchange student at New York University's Tisch School of the Arts. During his college years, he turned down a summer internship with Late Night with Conan O'Brien because he had committed to an internship with WNBC's press and publicity department.

Career

Early work
After graduating from Oberlin, Helms began his comedy and acting career as a writer and performer with New York City sketch comedy bands. While studying improvisation with the Upright Citizens Brigade troupe, he was a trainee film editor at Crew Cuts, a post-production facility in New York City, where he recorded some rough voiceover tracks that eventually led to paying voiceover work. He soon found a talent agent.

Television

Helms was performing comedy in New York City when, as he recalled in a 2005 interview, "The Daily Show had a sort of open audition with a casting company that I had dealt with. I read for the part, and got it".

In his April 2002 to mid-2006 tenure on the satirical news program, Helms contributed "field reports" in addition to hosting various segments of the show such as "Digital Watch", "Ad Nauseam" and "Mark Your Calendar". He has also contributed to the "This Week in God" segment. His 2005 segment "Battle of the Bulge", about the wearing of Speedo bathing suits on the beaches of Cape May, New Jersey, and his "Mass. Hysteria" segment, where he reported criticism of Massachusetts when it became the first state to legalize gay marriage, are regarded by TV Guide as his signature segments.

Helms left the show in 2006, but occasionally returned for brief appearances over the next two years. On July 21, 2008 he returned for "Obama Quest"—a segment covering Senator Barack Obama's trip to Iraq. He also occasionally narrated the "Prescott Group" educational films on sister series The Colbert Report. In late July 2006, NBC announced that Helms was added to the cast of the mockumentary The Office, alongside fellow The Daily Show correspondent Steve Carell, in a recurring role as Andy Bernard, a nostalgic Cornell graduate who is obsessed with a cappella music. Helms was a series regular starting with the 3rd season. "He had so much in common with this character we wanted to create," recalled Paul Lieberstein, a writer for the show who also plays Toby Flenderson, the human resources representative at the Scranton branch of Dunder Mifflin. "I can't remember when they started merging." Helms returned to The Daily Show on December 5, 2006, saying that he had been working "undercover at a paper company in Scranton", an allusion to his stint on The Office.

In February 2007, NBC announced that Helms had been promoted to series regular on The Office, and in February 2010 Helms was added to the show's opening credits. He quickly became a solidifying part of the cast, and one of the show's producers. In June 2009, in an interview with National Public Radio, he said that, like his character Andy Bernard, he had an interest in a cappella music.

Helms has also appeared on such television shows as The Mindy Project, Wilfred, NTSF:SD:SUV, Tanner on Tanner, Childrens Hospital, Arrested Development, and Cheap Seats, and in various Comedy Central specials. He was the celebrity guest on the August 3, 2015 survival-skills reality show Running Wild with Bear Grylls, coming to grips with his fear of heights on the Colorado Mountains. He has done commercial voiceover work in campaigns for Burger King, Doritos, Hotels.com, Sharp Aquos, and Advair asthma medication. He voices Neil the Angel, a character on Cartoon Network's Weighty Decisions series. He plays guitar, banjo, piano, as well as a sitar, in some of his entertainment performances.

He co-created the Peacock sitcom Rutherford Falls with Sierra Teller Ornelas (now showrunner) and Michael Schur. Together with Ornelas, the series has a total of five indigenous writers.

Film
Helms starred in the 2011 film Cedar Rapids and co-starred in the blockbuster The Hangover film trilogy as Stuart Price. He had minor roles, including Night at the Museum: Battle of the Smithsonian, Blackballed: The Bobby Dukes Story, Meet Dave, Harold & Kumar Escape from Guantanamo Bay, I'll Believe You, Evan Almighty, Semi-Pro and, with The Office co-star Jenna Fischer, Walk Hard: The Dewey Cox Story. In 2009, Helms appeared in The Goods: Live Hard, Sell Hard, directed by Neal Brennan and starring Jeremy Piven. In 2012, he voiced the Once-ler in The Lorax. He played the lead role, Rusty Griswold, in the 2015 film Vacation, a sequel/spin-off of the National Lampoon's Vacation series. The film began shooting in September 2014 in Helms' native Atlanta, with Christina Applegate playing Rusty's wife Debbie Griswold. In 2015, Helms starred in Jessie Nelson's movie, Love the Coopers. In 2017, he starred in The Clapper as Eddie Krumble, a paid audience member for infomercials. He has a whirlwind of unwanted overnight fame after a late-night talk show host publicizes his frequent infomercial appearances.

Helms voiced the title role in the DreamWorks animated film Captain Underpants: The First Epic Movie (2017). In 2013, he was attached to star in the unproduced Paramount Pictures Naked Gun reboot. Helms played Joe Gargan in the 2018 film Chappaquiddick.

Other work
Helms is in a bluegrass band called The Lonesome Trio with friends Ian Riggs and Jacob Tilove. They formed the band when they were at Oberlin College and still play a few shows every year. They recorded an eponymous album in summer 2013 shortly after appearing on the Bluegrass Situation stage at the Bonnaroo festival, which Helms curated. Helms is a self-confessed "bluegrass nerd" and founded the annual LA Bluegrass Situation festival. Helms plays banjo, guitar and piano.

He and Amy Reitnouer co-founded a music blog also titled The Bluegrass Situation. It summarizes its mission as "Creating and covering content across every level of the international scene, ranging from timeless traditional bluegrass, blues, and old-time to contemporary singer/songwriter, Americana, folk, and everything rootsy beyond and in between." On April 22, 2020, The Bluegrass Situation debuted The Whiskey Sour Happy Hour, a weekly music and comedy program benefiting the MusiCares COVID-19 Relief Fund and Direct Relief.

Helms features in the video for Mumford and Sons' song "Hopeless Wanderer". In 2015, he had a cameo appearance in the band's music video for the song "The Wolf".

Helms launched his own production company, Pacific Electric Picture Company, in 2013. The company had a two-year development deal with Universal Television.

In 2013, Helms co-wrote, produced, and starred in the Yahoo! Screen web series Tiny Commando, about a former Navy SEAL who is accidentally shrunken in a military experiment to four inches in height. Subsequently, he is deployed to places that his unique size enables him to infiltrate.

Civic life
Helms is a board member at RepresentUs, a non-profit group that works to pass anti-corruption laws in the United States.

Personal life 
Ed Helms is married and has one daughter.

Honors
Helms received an honorary Doctor of Fine Arts from Knox College, where he delivered the 2013 Commencement. 
In May 2014, Helms gave the convocation speech at Cornell University, alma mater of Andy Bernard, the character he portrayed for seven seasons on The Office. 
In May 2015, Helms gave the commencement speech at the University of Virginia.

Filmography

Film

Television

Music videos

References

External links 

 

21st-century American male actors
American banjoists
American male comedians
21st-century American comedians
American male film actors
American male television actors
American television writers
American male singers
American male voice actors
American male television writers
Living people
Male actors from Atlanta
Tisch School of the Arts alumni
Oberlin College alumni
People with congenital heart defects
Upright Citizens Brigade Theater performers
The Westminster Schools alumni
Writers Guild of America Award winners
1974 births
Comedians from Georgia (U.S. state)